Johny Mera Naam is a 1970 Indian Hindi-language crime action film directed by Vijay Anand. The film stars the director's brother, Dev Anand and Pran in the roles of brothers separated in childhood. Hema Malini, Jeevan, Premnath, I. S. Johar, Iftekhar, Padma Khanna also star in pivotal roles.

At the 18th Filmfare Awards, Vijay Anand won the Filmfare Best Screenplay Award, while actor I.S. Johar received his first Best Performance in a Comic Role for his triple roles: a steward in an aeroplane, an associate of criminals and a police officer. The film was remade in Kannada as Apoorva Sangama, in Telugu as Eduruleni Manishi and in Tamil as Raja.

Synopsis
Mohan and Sohan are the sons of a police inspector. The kids excel in boxing. Their father is killed by a goon following orders from Ranjit. Mohan kills the goon, takes refuge in a car boot, and goes missing.

Years later, Sohan goes on to become a CID officer called Sohan Kumar who solves his cases taking up different guises. He takes the identity of Johny, a petty thief and gets himself in jail, befriends Heera, solves a case wooing Rekha and finds the criminal. Finally, Rekha takes refuge in a car boot and goes missing.

Cast
 Dev Anand as Sohan / Johny
 Hema Malini as Rekha
 Pran as Mohan / Moti
 Jeevan as Heera
 Premnath as Ranjeet / Rai Sahib Bhupendra Singh
 I. S. Johar as Pehlaram  / Dujaram / Teejaram (Triple Role) 
 Iftekhar as Chief Inspector Mehta
 Sulochana Latkar as Mother
 Padma Khanna as Tara
 Randhawa as Babu

Box office
It was the highest grossing Bollywood film of 1970.

Soundtrack
The movie boasts one of the best performances of Kishore Kumar and Asha Bhosle. Johny Mera Naam marked some of the best music composed by the duo Kalyanji-Anandji and pro memoria lyrics of Indeevar.

Influences
The song "Pal Bhar Ke Liye" was used at the end of The Simpsons episode "Kiss Kiss, Bang Bangalore" (2006).

A scene of the film is shown in the 2007 thriller Johnny Gaddaar, prompting a character to give Johnny as a fake name and hence the film title.

References

External links

Trimurti Films
1970 films
Indian crime action films
Indian spy action films
1970s Hindi-language films
Films directed by Vijay Anand
Films scored by Kalyanji Anandji
Hindi films remade in other languages
1970s crime action films
1970s spy action films
Films set in Nepal
Films shot in Nepal
Films shot in Kathmandu